The 1921–22 season was the fifth and final season the Sphas played in the American League of Philadelphia, as the league disbanded before the schedule was complete. The team was referred to as Philadelphia Passon, Gottlieb, Black (the team founders' names) in league records for this season. Game-by-game records are not available for this season.

References

Philadelphia Sphas seasons